Delphine Levy (1969 – 13 July 2020) was a French manager of cultural institutions. She was director of Paris Musées between 2013 and 2020. She was a graduate of the École nationale d’Administration (ENA) and focused on improving the unique cultural qualities of museums and other cultural buildings across the country, focusing on promoting exhibitions that the locations would normally consider too risky to acquire funding for.

Levy died on 13 July 2020, aged 51.

References

1969 births
2020 deaths
Directors of museums in France
French women
Date of birth missing
Place of birth missing
Place of death missing
École nationale d'administration alumni